The Bukidnon woodcock (Scolopax bukidnonensis), or Philippine woodcock  is a medium-sized wader. It was only described as new to science as recently as 2001, although the initial specimens had been collected on Luzon in the 1960s, these were originally misidentified as Eurasian woodcock specimens. It was not until the bird was heard calling in 1993, and new specimens obtained on Mindanao in 1995, that it was realised that the species was new. It is listed as Least Concern by the IUCN.

Description
The Bukidnon woodcock is rich reddish-brown above, finely barred and vermiculated with black and broadly barred with blackish markings across the crown, the underparts are paler and buffer. The eye is placed high and far back on the head, and the beak is long with a flexible tip to extract worms and other invertebrates from the soil.

Distribution and habitat
This species is restricted to mountain forests (over 1000 m above sea level) on the islands of Mindanao (four mountaintops) and Luzon (center and north) in the Philippines. Its habitat is extremely remote and rugged, and is unsuitable for either logging or agriculture.

It is found in montane forest above 1000m on Luzon and Mindanao. Shy and secretive, it rests by day on the forest floor and is active at night. These birds fly in a wide circuit over the forest, giving a loud, metallic, rattling `pip-pip-pip-pip-pip` interspersed by very quiet grunts.

Behaviour
Little is known about the bird in the wild. It is described as having a "roding" display flight in January to March just before dawn, like other birds of the genus.

Status
The Bukidnon woodcock has a large range and it is relatively common within that range. Its population size has not been quantified but the IUCN has listed it as being of "Least Concern", believing that any decline in population is too slow as to justify placing the bird in a more threatened category.

References

External links
Birdlife International: Bukidnon woodcock species factsheet. Retrieved 2007-FEB-22.

Bukidnon woodcock
Birds of Luzon
Birds of Mindanao
Endemic birds of the Philippines
Bukidnon woodcock